Thelonious Monk in Italy is a live album by American jazz pianist Thelonious Monk featuring tracks recorded in Italy in 1961 and released on the Riverside label in 1963.

Reception

Allmusic awarded the album 3 stars stating "This is not one of Thelonious Monk's more significant dates, but his fans will still find moments to enjoy".

Track listing
All compositions by Thelonious Monk except as indicated

Side One
 "Jackie-Ing" - 4:53    
 "Epistrophy" (Kenny Clarke, Monk) - 4:59    
 "Body and Soul" (Frank Eyton, Johnny Green, Edward Heyman, Robert Sour) - 4:48    
 "Straight, No Chaser" - 9:06    
Side Two
 "Bemsha Swing" (Denzil Best, Monk) - 7:14    
 "San Francisco Holiday" - 6:04    
 "Crepuscule with Nellie" - 2:50    
 "Rhythm-A-Ning" - 5:45

Personnel 
Thelonious Monk - piano
Charlie Rouse - tenor saxophone 
John Ore - bass
Frankie Dunlop - drums

References 

1963 albums
Thelonious Monk live albums
Riverside Records live albums
Albums produced by Orrin Keepnews